Whestley Moolman (born 4 February 1990) is a South African rugby union footballer.   His regular playing position is scrum-half.   He represents the Golden Lions in the Currie Cup and Vodacom Cup. Moolman previously played for the Leopards before making the move to Johannesburg along with brother Bradley ahead of the 2012 season.

Reference List

External links 

Lions profile
itsrugby.co.uk profile

1990 births
Living people
Afrikaner people
Golden Lions players
Leopards (rugby union) players
Rugby union players from Welkom
Rugby union scrum-halves
South African people of Dutch descent
South African rugby union players